This is a list of Canadian films which were released in 2010:

See also
 2010 in Canada
 2010 in Canadian television

References

External links
Feature Films Released In 2010 With Country of Origin Canada at IMDb
Canada's Top Ten for 2010 (lists of top ten Canadian features and shorts, selected in a process administered by TIFF)
 List of 2010 box office number-one films in Canada

2010
2010 in Canadian cinema
Canada